Kasper König (born 1943) is a German museum director and curator.

Career
König was born in Mettingen. In 1965 he traveled to New York as a courier on behalf of the Robert Fraser Gallery, where he lived intermittently until 1978. From 1973 to 1975, König taught as an associate professor at the Nova Scotia College of Art and Design in Halifax, Canada. He became a professor at the Düsseldorf Art Academy in 1985. Portikus, an exhibition hall for contemporary art in Frankfurt am Main, was founded in 1987 by König. From 1988 to 2000, König taught as a professor at the Städelschule in Frankfurt am Main, which he headed as rector from 1989.
From 2000 to 2012, he was director of the Museum Ludwig in Cologne.

Exhibitions
 In 1966 König curated his first exhibition at the Moderna Museet in Stockholm: "Claes Oldenburg".
 1969 Curator: Andy Warhol, Stockholm
 In 1977 he was the founding director of Skulptur Projekte Münster, which then took place regularly in a cycle of ten years.
 Westkunst, Cologne 1981
 Curator Von hier aus – Zwei Monate neue deutsche Kunst in Düsseldorf in 1984.
 Chief curator of Manifesta 10, which was hosted in St. Petersburg in 2014.

Awards

Honorary doctorates
 2005 Nova Scotia College of Art and Design in Halifax

Controversy
In December 2018, König was accused by artist Cana Bilir-Meier of making racist statements about German Turks at a panel event at the Munich Kammerspiele theatre. These accusations have subsequently been criticised and rebuffed.

Personal life
He was married to the actress Edda Köchl-König (1942–2015). Their son Johann König is a Berlin-based art dealer.

References

External links
 
 

1943 births
German curators
German art historians
Living people
German art curators